JSC United Shipbuilding Corporation is an open joint stock company in Russia which unites shipbuilding, repair and maintenance subsidiaries in western and northern Russia, and in the country's Far East, to streamline civilian shipbuilding using military facilities.

United Shipbuilding Corporation is the 100% owner of Arctech Helsinki Shipyard, having bought the remaining 50% of the shares from its joint venture partner STX Finland Cruise Oy.

As of 2021, the corporation constructed up to 80% of ships in Russia.

History
United Shipbuilding Corporation was established in 2007 by a series of Presidential Decrees signed by President Vladimir Putin. According to the decree, the corporation has 3 subsidiaries: the Western Shipbuilding Center in St. Petersburg (Admiralty Shipyard), the Northern Shipbuilding and Maintenance Center in Severodvinsk and the Far Eastern Shipbuilding and Maintenance Center in Vladivostok. The state owns 100% of the shares.

In June 2012 Andrei Dyachkov was appointed to its president. On May 21, 2013, Russian President Putin said that Vladimir Shmakov would be appointed as a new president of the corporation the following week.

On 29 July 2014, the company was added to the Financial Sanctions List - Specially Designated Nationals List  by the U.S. Department of the Treasury as defined by the Executive Order 13661 related to Russia involvement in conflict in Ukraine.

In 2017, the corporation closed its Northern and Western subsidiary branches.

Sanctions 
Sanctioned by New Zealand in relation to the 2022 Russian invasion of Ukraine.

The company was sanctioned by the British government on 24 February 2022, as it was judged to have aided in the invasion of Ukraine.

Structure
USC integrates the following companies:
 33 Shipyard, Baltiysk
 Admiralty Shipyards, St. Petersburg
 Baltic Shipyard, St. Petersburg
 Vyborg Shipyard, Vyborg
 Zelenodolsk Design Bureau, Zelenodolsk
 Severnaya Verf, St. Petersburg
 Sredne-Nevskiy Shipyard, St. Petersburg
 Severnoye Design Bureau, St. Petersburg
 Arctech Helsinki Shipyard, Helsinki
 Nevskoe Design Bureau, Severodvinsk
 Almaz Design Bureau, St. Petersburg
 Krasnoye Sormovo Shipyard, Nizhny Novgorod
 Rubin Design Bureau, St. Petersburg
 Onega Research and Development Technological Bureau, Severodvinsk
 Malakhit Marine Engineering Bureau, St. Petersburg
 10 Shipyard, Polyarny
 Yantar Shipyard, Kaliningrad
 Amur Shipbuilding Plant, Komsomolsk-on-Amur
 Zvezdochka Shipyard, Severodvinsk
 Proletarsky zavod, St. Petersburg
 Khabarovskiy shipbuilding plant, Khabarovsk
 USC-Iceberg Central Design Bureau, St. Petersburg
 CNRG Group, Astrakhan
 Production Association Arktika, Severodvinsk
 Production Association Sevmash, Severodvinsk
 Svetlovsky enterprise ERA, Svetly
 35 SRZ branch of Zvezdochka SRC, Murmansk
 Joint Stock Company Shipbuilding plant 'Lotos', Narimanov
 Kronstadt Marine Plant, Kronstadt
 Sevastopol Shipyard
 Lazurit Central Design Bureau

References

External links

 
Shipbuilding companies of Russia
Holding companies of Russia
Manufacturing companies based in Saint Petersburg
Russian brands
Russian companies established in 2007
Government-owned companies of Russia
Defence companies of Russia